Helcystogramma chambersella is a moth in the family Gelechiidae. It was described by Mary Murtfeldt in 1874. It is found in North America, where it has been recorded from Pennsylvania, Illinois, Ohio, South Carolina, Tennessee, Louisiana, Mississippi, Florida, Oklahoma, Missouri, Texas, Arizona and California.

The length of the forewings is 3.5–5 mm. Adults range from creamy white to pale yellowish white, dusted with fuscous to ochreous yellow and brown. Adults have been recorded on wing from April to September.

The larvae feed on Ambrosia artemisiifolia, Ambrosia confertifolia and Ambrosia ptilostachya.

References

Moths described in 1874
chambersella
Moths of North America